Shah Alam Cemetery or Tanah Perkuburan Seksyen 21 Shah Alam is a cemetery in Shah Alam, Selangor, Malaysia. It is located at Section 21 near Panasonic Sports Complex.

Features

Muslim Cemetery
The Shah Alam Muslim Cemetery is a public Muslim cemetery managed by Shah Alam City Council (MBSA). It is divided into three phases: Phase 1, Phase 2 and Phase 3.

Notable burials 
 Ustaz Asri (Rabbani) – Rabbani's nasyid vocalist leader (died 2009)
 Datuk Muhammad Jaiss Ahmad aka\ Ahmad Jais – Veteran actor and singer (died 2011)
 Dato' Bukhari Che Muda – TV Alhijrah chief executive officer (died 2013)
 Md Hashim Yahya – former Federal Territory Mufti (died 2014)
 Lieutenant General (Rtd) Datuk Jaafar II Datuk Sir Onn – younger brother of third Prime Minister, Tun Hussein Onn (died 2014)
 Tan Sri Dr Ani Arope – former executive chairman of Tenaga Nasional Berhad (TNB)  (1992–1997) (died 2014)
 Azmil Mustapha – Veteran actor and religious speaker (died 2018)

Shah Alam Nirvana Memorial Park
The Shah Alam Nirvana Memorial Park is a private memorial park managed by Nirvana Multi Asia Sdn Bhd.

Notable burials

victims of the Malaysia Airlines MH17 crash on 17 July 2014 (died 2014)

 Captain Wan Amran Wan Hussin – Malaysia Airlines MH17 pilot who perished in the crash, (died 2014)
 Foo Ming Lee, (died 2014)
 Ng Qing Zheng, (died 2014)

References

External links
 

Cemeteries in Selangor
Shah Alam